Dodging the Clock is a Quebec film directed by Ricardo Trogi and released in 2005.

Plot 
The story follows three men in their thirties trying to have their first kid.

Critical reception
In December 2005, it was named to the Toronto International Film Festival's annual Canada's Top Ten list of the year's best films.

References

External links

2005 films
Canadian comedy films
Films directed by Ricardo Trogi
French-language Canadian films
2000s Canadian films